Shreerastu Shubhamastu is an Indian Kannada language drama series launched on Zee Kannada from 31 October 2022. The show is an official remake of Zee Marathi's Aggabai Sasubai. It stars Sudha Rani, Ajit Hande and Deepak Gowda in lead roles.

Cast 
 Sudha Rani as Tulasi
 Ajit Hande as Madhav
 Deepak Gowda as Samarth
 Chandana Raghavendra as Siri
 Venkat Rao as Dathatreya

Adaptations

References

External links 
 Shreerastu Shubhamastu at ZEE5

Kannada-language television shows
2022 Indian television series debuts
Zee Kannada original programming